is a Japanese photographer. His work is held at the Asia Art Archive, the Center for Creative Photography, and the Tokyo Metropolitan Museum of Photography.

References

Japanese photographers
1947 births
Living people
Place of birth missing (living people)